Monica Guglielmi (born 2 September 1974) is an Italian former professional tennis player.

Guglielmi was active on tour in the 1990s and had a best singles ranking of 406. She made her only WTA Tour main draw appearance in 1992 at the Cesena Championships, where she was beaten in the first round by Laura Golarsa.

ITF finals

Singles: 2 (0–2)

References

External links
 
 

1974 births
Living people
Italian female tennis players
20th-century Italian women